Daniel Walter Schmid (26 December 1941 – 5 August 2006) was a Swiss theatre and film director.

Biography 
In 1982, his film Hécate was entered into the 33rd Berlin International Film Festival. His film Beresina, or the Last Days of Switzerland was screened in the Un Certain Regard section at the 1999 Cannes Film Festival. In 1988, he was a member of the jury at the 38th Berlin International Film Festival.

A new documentary film on Schmid's life, Daniel Schmid – Le chat qui pense, had its U.S. premiere at the Frameline Film Festival in San Francisco on 20 June 2011.

Filmography / works
1967:  (dir. George Moorse) (assistant director; TV film)
1967: Claire (dir. Peter Lilienthal) (assistant director; TV film)
1967: Abgründe (dir. Peter Lilienthal) (assistant director; TV film)
1969: Samuel Beckett (dir. Rosa von Praunheim) (cinematographer; short film)
1970: Thut alles im Finstern, eurem Herrn das Licht zu ersparen (director, writer; TV film)
1970: Der Bomberpilot (dir. Werner Schroeter) (co-director; TV film)
1972:  (producer, director, writer)
1974: La Paloma (director, writer)
1976: Shadow of Angels (director, writer)
1977: Violanta (director, writer)
1981: Notre Dame de la Croisette (director)
1982: Hécate (director, writer)
1983: Mirage de la vie (producer, director, writer; TV film)
1984: Barbe-bleue (dir. Jean Bovon) (co-director; TV film)
1984: Il bacio di Tosca (Der Kuss der Tosca) (director)
1985: Lulu (co-director; TV film)
1986: Der Rosenkönig (producer)
1987: Jenatsch (director, writer)
1988: Guglielmo Tell (director; TV film)
1990: Les amateurs (director)
1992: Hors Saison / Zwischensaison (director, writer)
1995: The Written Face (director, writer) – documentary on the Japanese Kabuki star, Tamasaburo Bando featuring Butoh dancer, Kazuo Ohno
1996: Linda di Chamounix (dir. Alf Bernhard-Leonardi) (co-director; TV film)
1999: Beresina oder Die letzten Tage der Schweiz (director)
2002: Beatrice di Tenda (dir. Yves-André Hubert) (co-director; TV film)

Actor
1972: The Merchant of Four Seasons – 1st Candidate
1972: Ludwig: Requiem for a Virgin King – Aussenminister von der Pfordten
1977: The American Friend – Igraham
1978: Judith Therpauve – Jean
1979: Roberte – Salomon
1981: Lili Marleen – Pförtner
1984: Cinémato – Himself

References

External links
http://www.daniel-schmid.com – Official website

Daniel Schmid at the Swiss Film Directory

1941 births
2006 deaths
LGBT film directors
LGBT theatre directors
Swiss film directors
Swiss theatre directors
Deaths from cancer in Switzerland
German-language film directors
Georges Delerue Award winners
20th-century LGBT people
21st-century LGBT people